Zakaryan (in Armenian: Զաքարյան) or Zakarian (in Western Armenian: Զաքարեան) is an Armenian surname, originating from Zakar, the Armenian equivalent of the name Zechariah, which means "God has remembered". The name may refer to:

Garbis Zakaryan (1930–2020), Turkish boxer
Geoffrey Zakarian (born 1959), American chef
Lusine Zakaryan (1937–1992), Armenian singer
Michel Der Zakarian (born 1963), Armenian football player and manager
Ruth Zakarian (born 1966), American actress and model
Vanik Zakaryan (born 1936), Armenian scientist
Vardan Zakaryan, German boxer
Zakar Zakarian (1849–1923), Armenian painter

See also
Zacharias (surname)
Zakar (disambiguation)
Zakarian, Iran

References

Armenian-language surnames
Patronymic surnames
Surnames from given names